Wellington Opera is an opera company based in Wellington, New Zealand formed in 2020 by the Wellington Opera Trust, a charitable organisation, with funding and support from Creative New Zealand, Wellington City Council and the Kiri Te Kanawa Foundation.

History

The company's first staging was a production of Mozart's Don Giovanni in Wellington's Opera House directed by Sara Brodie, in April 2021. The cast included New Zealand-born bass-baritone James Ioelu, Christian Thurston, and Amelia Berry, accompanied by Orchestra Wellington conducted by artistic director Matthew Ross. The performances were well attended and received positive reviews.

The 2022 production of Verdi's La traviata reopened Wellington's largest theatre, the St James Theatre, after it was closed in 2018 for earthquake strengthening work after the 2016 Kaikōura earthquake. The opening night performance was somewhat hampered by COVID-19 infections among the cast and crew, but was nonetheless received positively by the audience and reviewers.

References 

New Zealand opera companies
Musical groups from Wellington